Qızılburun (also, Kochevka Kyzyl-Burun and Kyzylburun) is a village and municipality in the Hajigabul Rayon of Azerbaijan.  It has a population of 1,034.

References 

Populated places in Hajigabul District